Mary Ann, Lady Parkinson (née Heneghan; born 16 July 1936) is a British journalist and television presenter, and the wife of Sir Michael Parkinson.

Parkinson was born in Doncaster, West Riding of Yorkshire. She presented the 1970s magazine programme Good Afternoon, produced by Thames Television. Amongst other TV work, she also frequently appeared as a panelist on Through the Keyhole.

References

External links

1936 births
Living people
English journalists
English television presenters
People from Doncaster
Wives of knights